Rex E. Alexander (June 1, 1924 – March 28, 1982) was a college basketball and tennis coach who was the head coach of the Murray State Racers from 1954 to 1958.

An assistant under Harlan Hodges, Alexander was promoted to head coach in 1954 after Hodges left MSU for Idaho and former North Carolina head coach Tom Scott turned down the job. In his four seasons at Murray State, 
Alexander had a 45–54 record and no tournament appearances. He was replaced by DePauw University head coach Cal Luther on March 5, 1958, but stayed on as an assistant coach and professor. In 1976 he was the recipient of the Murray State Distinguished Professor award. He was inducted into the Murray State Athletics Hall of Fame in 2000.

Alexander's son David played basketball at Western Kentucky in 1971. His grandson Troy played for Southern Methodist University.

Alexander was a native of Union County, Kentucky.  He died in an automobile accident in 1982.

References

External links
Sports Reference – Rex Alexander

1982 deaths
Basketball coaches from Kentucky
Murray State Racers baseball coaches
Murray State Racers men's basketball coaches
People from Union County, Kentucky
Murray State University alumni
1924 births